The following is a list of films which are set in or around Salt Lake City, Utah. Note that Utah is a right-to-work state, and as such, has become a popular filming location, because actors and labor are not required to follow rules for the Screen Actors Guild. Salt Lake City provides a generic Western urban landscape, often playing the substitute for Los Angeles, Denver, or unnamed cities.

Films set in Salt Lake City
Airport 1975
Brigham Young
Forever Strong
Mr. Krueger's Christmas
Net Worth
Plan 10 from Outer Space (a spoof based on Plan 9 from Outer Space)
SLC Punk!
The Crow: Salvation
The Way of the Gun

Films shot in Salt Lake City
127 Hours
Airport 1975
Brigham Young
The Brown Bunny
Carnival of Souls
Con Air
Dawn of the Dead
Drive Me Crazy
Dumb and Dumber
Forever Strong
Halloween sequels after Halloween III: Season of the Witch
High School Musical
High School Musical 2
High School Musical 3
The House of Seven Corpses
Independence Day
Letters from a Killer
A Life Less Ordinary
Melvin and Howard
Minutemen
Mr. Krueger's Christmas
My Girlfriend's Boyfriend
The Philadelphia Experiment
Pool Hall Junkies
The Crow: Salvation
Revenge of the Ninja
The Sandlot
Savannah Smiles
SLC Punk!
Three O'Clock High
Unaccompanied Minors
Unhook the Stars
The Way of the Gun
The World's Fastest Indian
Charley (based on the novel by Jack Weyland)

Television shows shot in Salt Lake City
The Amazing Race 8
portions of Big Love
portions of Everwood
episodes of Flip Men
Insomniac with Dave Attell Season 4
The Jerk Theory
Promised Land
The TV miniseries of The Stand
Touched by an Angel Almost entirely filmed on location throughout Salt Lake City and Utah.
Breaking Pointe Reality TV show following Ballet West and highlighting downtown locations.
portion of Top Gear America "Best Taxi Challenge" Season 3 episode 11, Drifting BMW M5
Little Chocolatiers Entirely filmed in Salt Lake City.
The Real Housewives of Salt Lake City
Andi Mack
High School Musical: The Musical: The Series Season 1 & 2